Helen Wai-Har Sham-Ho OAM (born 9 September 1943) is a former Australian politician.

Early life and education
Of Bao'an Hakka ancestry, Sham-Ho was born in Hong Kong. She migrated to Australia in 1961.

She earned a Bachelor of Arts and a Diploma of Social Work from the University of Sydney, graduating in 1967, and earned an LL.B. at Macquarie University.

Her first marriage produced two daughters; her second marriage was to Robert Ho on 15 December 1987. In 1982 she had joined the Epping Branch of the Liberal Party.

Political career 
In 1988, she was elected to the New South Wales Legislative Council for the Liberal Party. She was the first Chinese to be elected to an Australian parliament. She continued as a Liberal MLC until 1998, when she resigned from the party to sit as an independent. She retired before the 2003 election.
In 1992 she became one of the eminent Australians
serving on the original Foundation Council of
Australians for Constitutional Monarchy.

Community service 
Since her retirement she has been involved in various fund-raising activities in her local community. Sham-Ho is a long-time advocate of multiculturalism and has been involved with various events to be a bridge for the Chinese migrants in the Australian society.

References

1943 births
Australian monarchists
Australian politicians of Chinese descent
Hong Kong people of Hakka descent
People from Bao'an County
Independent members of the Parliament of New South Wales
Living people
Macquarie Law School alumni
Members of the New South Wales Legislative Council
Liberal Party of Australia members of the Parliament of New South Wales
Recipients of the Medal of the Order of Australia
University of Sydney alumni
21st-century Australian politicians
Women members of the New South Wales Legislative Council
21st-century Australian women politicians